The Socialists' Party of Aragon (PSOE–Aragón) is the regional branch in Aragon of the Spanish Socialist Workers' Party (PSOE), main centre-left party in Spain since the 1970s.

Electoral performance

Cortes of Aragon

Cortes Generales

European Parliament

References

1978 establishments in Spain
Aragon
Political parties established in 1978
Political parties in Aragon
Social democratic parties in Spain